St. Mary of the Assumption Catholic Church is a Roman Catholic parish in Avilla, Indiana. It is located in the Roman Catholic Diocese of Fort Wayne-South Bend. Its current parish church was dedicated in 1878.

The parish supports its own parochial school and a small convent for its Franciscan Sisters of the Sacred Heart. St. Mary's was also the site of the first motherhouse in America for the Franciscan sisters.

References

External links
 St. Mary Catholic School

Churches in the Roman Catholic Diocese of Fort Wayne–South Bend
Buildings and structures in Noble County, Indiana
Roman Catholic churches completed in 1878
19th-century Roman Catholic church buildings in the United States